Allan James Eastman  (21 January 19122 November 1987) was an Australian public servant and diplomat.

Life and career
In 1938 Eastman became a captain in the army legal department, before being seconded to the 1st AIF in 1941. He became a Lieutenant-Colonel in January 1943.

Eastman joined the Commonwealth Public Service in the Department of External Affairs in 1946. His first appointment was as Australian Consul to Siam.

Eastman was appointed the Australian High Commissioner to Ceylon (later Sri Lanka) in 1956.

In 1962, Eastman was appointed Senior External Affairs representative in London. From London, Eastman went to Malaysia to take up an appointment as the Australian High Commissioner to Malaysia from 1965 to 1969.  During his posting, Malaysia signed up to the ASEAN Declaration and Australia pledged to provide defence support for the Malaysia-Singapore area.

Returning to Canberra, Eastman was appointed the head of Department of Foreign Affairs defence division. His posting to Brussels as Ambassador to Belgium was announced in November 1971.

Whilst Australian Ambassador to Mexico (1975–1977), Eastman oversaw an office of nine staff, including Penelope Wensley who was threatened with kidnapping during her posting.

Eastman retired from public service in 1977. He died on 2 November 1987.

Awards
Eastman was made an Officer of the Order of the British Empire (OBE) in 1961 for distinguished public service, while serving as the Australian external affairs representative at the London High Commission. He was promoted to Commander of the Order (CBE) in 1965.

References

1912 births
1987 deaths
Ambassadors of Australia to Belgium
Ambassadors of Australia to Mexico
High Commissioners of Australia to Malaysia
High Commissioners of Australia to Sri Lanka
Australian Commanders of the Order of the British Empire